Michel Emer (June 19, 1906 – November 23, 1984), (real name Emer Rosenstein), was a French musician, composer and lyricist. His songs have been performed by Edith Piaf, Fréhel, Damia, Lys Gauty, Yves Montand, Jean Sablon, André Claveau, Ray Ventura and his Collegians, Luis Mariano, Tino Rossi, and Eartha Kitt. He also wrote songs for at least one of his wife Jacqueline Maillan's shows.

The first of his songs to be sung by Edith Piaf was "L'Accordéoniste", which he composed in 1940. He went on to write more than twenty songs for her, including "J'm'en fous pas mal", "Bal dans ma rue", and "A quoi ça sert l'amour?", one of her most famous songs, which she sang as a duet with her second husband Theo Sarapo.

He co-authored with Charles Trenet the music for the song "Y'a d'la joie", and arranged many of Trenet's songs. Jean Sablon performed and recorded his song "Béguin-Biguine" in 1932.

Personal life
In 1954 he married the actress Jacqueline Maillan. He is buried in the Cimetière de Bagneux in Paris.

Compositions

Songs
(Selective)
"L'Accordéoniste" (1940)
"J'm'en fous pas mal"
"Bal dans ma rue"
"A quoi ça sert l'amour?"

Operettas
1934: Loulou et ses boys- 3-act operette by Marc Cab, Paul Farge and Pierre Bayle. Music by Michel Emer and Georges Sellers (Théâtre Daunou, opening 7 December 1934)
1939: Billie et son équipe - operette by Michel Emer and Jean Sautreuil. Story by André Mouëzy-Éon and Albert Willemetz (Théâtre Mogador, opening 6 March 1939)

Recordings
Hello, Baby, Mademoiselle / Dans les plaines du Far-West (Michel Emer et son orchestre - 78 rpm on Polydor
Chanson aux nuages / Perfidia - 78 rpm on Polydor

Soundtracks
(Selective)
1934 : Les Suites d'un premier lit by Félix Gandéra
1939 : Le Paradis de Satan by Félix Gandéra
1947 : Counter Investigation by Jean Faurez
1951 : Les Maître-nageurs by Henri Lepage
1951 : Chacun son tour by André Berthomieu
1953 : Un acte d'amour by Anatole Litvak
1953 : Chasse au crime (TV series) - Episode "Police Headquarters"
1957 : Let's Be Daring, Madame by Robert Vernay
1957 : Fumée blonde by Robert Vernay and André Montoisy
1957 : Sylviane de mes nuits by Marcel Blistène
1958 : It's All Adam's Fault by Jacqueline Audry
1958 : The Stowaway (English version) by Ralph Habib and Lee Robinson
1958: Le Passager clandestin (French version) 
1958 : Premier mai by Luis Saslavsky
1958 : Mimi Pinson by Robert Darène
1958 : Madame et son auto by Robert Vernay
1959 : Houla-houla by Robert Darène
1968 : Puce (TV film) by Jacques Audoir
1973 : Joë petit boum-boum (animation film) by Jean Image
1979 : Féfé de Broadway'' (TV film) by Jeannette Hubert

French composers
French male composers
French songwriters
Male songwriters
1906 births
1984 deaths
20th-century French musicians
20th-century French male musicians